The Enns Valley Railway is an electrified, standard gauge main line railway in the Austrian states of Styria and Salzburg. It was originally built and operated by the Empress Elisabeth Railway Company. The line is an important link for the two Austrian states, West Austria and Germany.

External links 
 Enns Valley Railway photograph album at eisenbahn-in-oesterreich.at.

Railway lines in Austria